"Bloodlines" was a 1993 comic book story arc published by DC Comics. It was an intracompany crossover that ran through DC's superhero annuals and concluded with a two-issue Bloodbath miniseries written by Dan Raspler. The antagonists were a race of monstrous dragon-like aliens who killed humans for their spinal fluid. A small fraction of the parasite's victims survived and become super-heroes via their ordeal. This plot device introduced a wave of "New Blood" superheroes into the DC Universe. Seven DC Comics series were spun out of the event: Blood Pack, Razorsharp and the Psyba-Rats, Hitman, Anima, Loose Cannon, Argus and Gunfire.

Publication history
The villains of the crossover were the formerly imprisoned survivors of a race of alien parasites named Angon, Gemir, Glonth, Lissik, Pritor, Venev, and Slodd that could shapeshift into humanoid form. These humanoid forms were based on the initial entities they first encountered, a squadron of L.E.G.I.O.N. soldiers, most of whom perished. The bite of the Bloodlines Parasites was administered to the back of the neck by a mouth-within-a-mouth. This bite is intended to remove the spinal fluid for sustenance. This usually killed the victim for food, but occasionally awakened superhuman powers in the recipient. This was also the means by which the creatures could reproduce.

Each of the annuals involved in the crossover used this plot device to introduce a new super-powered character to the DC Universe. The Bloodlines crossover event spanned 23 of DC's regular titles and wrapped up in the two-part miniseries Bloodbath. The alien parasites that came to Earth to gather spinal fluid sacrificed themselves to help birth a gigantic alien known as the Taker. Many long-term heroes were absorbed into the monster, only to be saved by the very heroes the parasites had created.

This series spun off into the Blood Pack miniseries. Gunfire also had a short-lived series. Some of the heroes created by the aliens died in the 2005-2006's Infinite Crisis event.

The only New Blood character to succeed as an independent property was Hitman, who first appeared in 1993's Demon Annual and went on to star in his own sixty-issue ongoing series from 1996 to 2001 written by Garth Ennis and drawn by John McCrea.

In fact, of the few times New Blood characters made appearances after the Bloodlines event, a majority of the time they are killed off. Faces of Evil: Prometheus and JLA/Hitman #1 are examples. The former featured a brief cameo of the remaining members of the Bloodpack, only to have a majority of the team killed or maimed by the titular villain; it was referenced in the Justice League of America tie-in to the Blackest Night crossover, where Doctor Light mockingly mentions that most of the Blood Pack heroes had died and were quickly forgotten by the rest of the superhero community. Hitman/JLA #1, set before this, sees the Wally West Flash mention the Bloodline heroes' long casualty list and states, with irritation, that most of them are incompetent and are constantly trying to 'team up' with the League, while Green Lantern Kyle Rayner simply sums them up with: "Those guys are lame. I mean, they are really lame".

Hitman and Hitman/JLA both offered up sequels to Bloodlines. The first had the CIA trying to duplicate the power-giving effects of the parasites. The second, set chronologically earlier, had a separate breed of Bloodlines parasites. Hitman/JLA also had a scene showing the White House taking the Bloodlines parasites as so big a threat that they were willing to launch nuclear missiles at the Justice League to prevent the parasites from reaching Earth again.

Bloodlines Parasites

Origins
The seven Bloodlines Parasites were created for the Bloodlines crossover. The parasites premiered in Lobo (vol. 2) Annual #1 written by Alan Grant and drawn by Christian Alamy. The Parasites came from the same dimension as a powerful Shaman named Pax who gained his own powers due to being bitten by one of them and left for dead. The parasites escaped from their prison dimension. In the Lobo issue, they encountered a grouping of L.E.G.I.O.N. officers, whom they killed and took their alternate human forms from. They later ended up on Earth; while there they took to feeding on humans.

Feeding
The aliens feed by draining the spinal fluid of their prey after administering a small dose of paralytic venom. They feed using a secondary proboscis-like jaw similar to the Xenomorphs from the Alien movies. If the feeding process is performed on a human possessing the metagene, the trauma of feeding on that victim will usually activate their metagene, granting them superpowers. Those so activated took to calling themselves "New Bloods".

Biology
The eight aliens included the seven parasites. All parasites had a heavy exoskeleton, four digits on each limb (one of which is small and opposable), skeletal faces, and the aforementioned feeding proboscis. Each parasite, however, had unique features and personalities based on the Seven Deadly Sins.  
Angon was red, had spiked shoulder plates, and was driven by anger. She was responsible for creating Edge, Ballistic, Jamm, and Prism. Gemir was red with bat-like wings. He was motivated by greed and had flaming hair in his human form. He was responsible for Joe Public, Myriad, Sparx, Cardinal Sin, and Samaritan. Glonth was a light blue, rotund beast with a lion-like mane who was motivated by gluttony. He created Loose Cannon, Hitman, and Chimera. Pritor was the prideful blue parasite with butterfly wings. He created Lionheart and Geist. Lissik was the lustful pink/purple parasite with moth-like wings. She created Anima, Nightblade, Hook, Terrorsmith, and Mongrel. Slodd was a slothful, off-white parasite with large patagium beneath his arms. Venev was an envious, green, six-armed parasite responsible for creating Argus, Razorsharp, Gunfire and Ragnarok. All of the Parasites gave themselves over to feed the Taker.

Parasites return

JLA
A new group of parasitic aliens from the same universe infiltrated a space shuttle returning to earth. When the JLA sent Green Lantern to investigate, his ring's readings showed that these parasites had genetic similarities with the Bloodlines parasites. These aliens, however, were much smaller and permanently attached themselves to their human hosts. They controlled their hosts' minds, could communicate telepathically, and gave each non-superpowered host a superpower. These new parasites managed to take control of, or incapacitate, the entire Justice League on the moon. In order to stop them from reaching earth, Hitman (who was invited to the JLA Watchtower so that his blood could be analyzed) had to kill or maim several of the astronaut hosts.  While some members of the JLA felt that this was murder, others recognized that Hitman stopped the invasion in the only way that he could.

Batman and the Outsiders
Another parasite, alone, is found by the Outsiders in a Gotham City club, being held captive, and admission charged for those wishing to gain superpowers. Nonetheless, as the parasites only activate the metagene in a number of humans, most customers do not survive the ordeal. Although the ending of Batman and the Outsiders (vol. 2) #10 had it flying off into the Gotham night with Batman on its back trying to bring it down, the story was interrupted with a Batman R.I.P. crossover, leaving the parasite's story unresolved.

New Bloods 

Some of the characters whose metagenes were activated by the parasites are Argus, Loose Cannon, Razorsharp, Terrorsmith, Hitman and Gunfire. If too much parasite venom was absorbed by the host's system it would cause hideous abnormalities, as seen with Terrorsmith. The mother alien known as the Taker was destroyed with the help of all the human New Bloods. Pax helped banish these aliens by sealing them up in the other-dimensional home of the Taker.

List of New Bloods
The superhumans whose powers were awakened by the alien parasites were known collectively as "New Bloods". Individually, they were:
Anima
"Animus-summoning grunge rocker" debuted in The New Titans Annual #9.
Argus
"Shadow-melding undercover agent from Central City" debuted in The Flash (vol. 2) Annual #6.
Ballistic
"Korean-American hero and an armed and dangerous vigilante" debuted in Batman Annual #17.
Cardinal Sin
"Disillusioned priest" debuted in Batman: Legends of the Dark Knight Annual #3.
Chimera
"Illusion-creating heroine of India" debuted in Team Titans Annual #1.
Edge
"Blade-hurling community hero" debuted in Superman: The Man of Steel Annual #2.
Geist
"Ghostly night-hero, ironically only becomes visible in the dark"  debuted in Detective Comics Annual #6.
Gunfire
"Able to explosively convert matter to energy" debuted in Deathstroke Annual #2.
Hitman
"A hitman who gained the powers of telepathy and X-ray vision" debuted in Demon Annual #2.
Hook
"Hook-handed former soldier" debuted in Green Arrow (vol. 2) Annual #6
Jamm
"Prodigious surfer-dude" debuted in Legion of Super-Heroes (vol. 4) Annual #4.
Joe Public
"Strength-siphoning patriot" debuted in Batman: Shadow of the Bat Annual #1.
Krag
"Stone bodied hero, super strength" debuted in Justice League America Annual #7.
Layla
"Tough-as-nails space explorer" debuted in Lobo (vol. 2) Annual #1.
Lionheart
"Armored high-tech knight, hero of Great Britain" debuted in Justice League International Annual #4.
Loose Cannon
"Super-strong ex-cop, a mood ring version of the Hulk whose color changes as he gets angrier" debuted in Action Comics Annual #5.
Loria
"Woman who could transform into living metal, super strong agent of the Quorum" debuted in Showcase '94 #12.
Mongrel
"Darkforce-blasting African American-Vietnamese hero" debuted in Hawkman (vol. 3) Annual #1.
Myriad
"Personality-absorbing assassin" debuted in Superman (vol. 2) Annual #5.
Nightblade
"Chinese-American regenerating martial artist, survived Mongul's destruction of Coast City"  debuted in Green Lantern (vol. 3) Annual #2.
Pax
"Last of his race, space-shaman" debuted in L.E.G.I.O.N. Annual #4.
Prism
"Light-manipulating scientist" debuted in Eclipso Annual #1.
Razorsharp
"Sword-limb'd hacker" debuted in Robin (vol. 2) Annual #2.
Shadowstryke
"Tragic hero, dark force energy" debuted in Justice League America Annual #7.
Slingshot
"African-American heroine, power to give anything she touches an acceleration factor" debuted in Justice League America Annual #7.
Sparx
"Lightning-wielding heroine from Canada", member of the Force Family debuted in The Adventures of Superman Annual #5.
Terrorsmith
"Monster-making villain" debuted in Justice League America Annual #7.

Another New Blood, Freight Train, was introduced in Outsiders vol. 4 #30, described as: "Black Canadian mercenary with the ability to absorb kinetic energy and give himself superdense skin, superspeed, and superhuman strength".

Blood Pack

With corporate backing, and under the leadership of seasoned veteran Jade, some of the New Bloods formed a superhero team known as the Blood Pack. The series was created by Charles Moore and Christopher Taylor. Blood Pack was a four issue limited series.

Blood Pack Members
Jade - Jennie-Lynn Hayden is a living power ring, and the daughter of Green Lantern Alan Scott. She is team leader.
Ballistic
Nightblade
Loria
Geist
Mongrel
Sparx
Razorsharp

Loria would die in the final issue of the series. Most of the team's members - Ballistic, Geist, Mongrel, Nightblade and Razorsharp - were slain by Superboy-Prime in Infinite Crisis #7, the final issue of the 2005-2006 DC event, incinerated by his heat vision. During the events of Blackest Night, the five slain heroes were reanimated as members of the Black Lantern Corps and head for Earth Prime to torment Superboy-Prime. He destroys them by using the black ring cycling through the power set of emotions, resulting in a burst of colored energy that destroys Black Lanterns. Geist and Nightblade would later appear during Final Crisis, amongst a large group of "forgotten" characters encountering Superman in Limbo.

A new Blood Pack was introduced in Faces of Evil: Prometheus, made up of other surviving Bloodlines heroes. Led by Argus, the team included Gunfire, Anima, and Hook. Hook was killed by an impostor Prometheus. Gunfire's hands were amputated and Anima was killed in an ensuing encounter with the real Prometheus.

Chapter order
Bloodlines was divided into four "chapters": Outbreak, Earthplague, Deathstorm, and Bloodbath. The order of the storyline is as follows:

Bloodlines: Outbreak
 Lobo (vol. 2) Annual #1
 Superman: The Man of Steel Annual #2
 Batman: Shadow of The Bat Annual #1
 The Flash (vol. 2) Annual #6
 The New Titans Annual #9
 Superman (vol. 2) Annual #5
 Green Lantern (vol. 3) Annual #2
 Batman Annual #17
 Justice League International Annual #4

Bloodlines: Earthplague
 Robin (vol. 2) Annual #2
 Action Comics Annual #5
 Legion of Super-Heroes (vol. 4) Annual #4
 Green Arrow (vol. 2) Annual #6
 Detective Comics Annual #6
 Justice League America Annual #7
 The Adventures of Superman Annual #5
 Hawkman (vol. 3) Annual #1

Bloodlines: Deathstorm
 Deathstroke, the Terminator Annual #2
 Eclipso Annual #1
 Demon Annual #2
 Batman: Legends of The Dark Knight Annual #3
 Team Titans Annual #1
 L.E.G.I.O.N. '93 Annual #4

Bloodlines: Bloodbath
 Bloodbath #1
 Bloodbath #2

The New 52
As part of The New 52 (a reboot of DC's continuity), the Bloodlines crossover was revamped and integrated as a six-issue miniseries. When a meteor crashes to Earth, bringing with it an unspeakable alien presence that terrorizes a nearby small town, the lucky ones die first. As for the rest, they find themselves locked in a hellish struggle for control of their bodies and their minds.

References

External links
 Bloodlines at the DC Database Project
 DCU Guide: Blood Pack
 Vanishing Point: Bloodlines Checklist

1993 comics debuts
Alien invasions in comics